Advanced metric round open events were featured for Archery from 1976 to 1984 in the Summer Paralympic Games.

Men's events 
There were four men's events between 1976 and 1984.

Men's advanced metric round open

Men's advanced metric round paraplegic

Men's advanced metric round team open

Men's advanced metric round tetraplegic

Women's events 
Only one women's advanced metric round open occurred between 1976 and 1980.

Women's advanced metric open 

Defunct events at the Summer Paralympics
Archery at the Summer Paralympics